The Black Tapes is a fiction podcast created by Paul Bae and Terry Miles. It is hosted by Alex Reagan (voiced by Lori Henry), released as a spin-off of the fictional radio program Pacific Northwest Stories. The series is produced by Nic Silver (voiced by Terry Miles). Reagan narrates a nonfiction-styled fictional story over multiple episodes, using a format that has been compared to Serial. The story begins as a biography of paranormal investigator Dr. Richard Strand (voiced by Christian Sloan), an "evangelical skeptic" on a mission to debunk all claims of the supernatural. Reagan becomes interested in his collection of unsolved cases, which she begins calling his "Black Tapes," and the podcast evolves into an exploration of these cases, paranormal culture, and the mysterious life of Dr. Strand.

Production
Episodes vary in length, from thirty-five to fifty minutes. New episodes were originally available weekly, but partway through the first season the schedule was revised to every other week.

The original run of The Black Tapes was from May 21 2015 to September 7 2017. The show ended with a six episode wrap-up and the creators stated that was the end. Then on March 20 2018 it was announced on the official Twitter account for The Black Tapes that the show would return for another season.

On January 13 2020 season 3 of The Black Tapes was re-released with no changes to the audio. However, the episode description of the final episode "Into the Black" was changed to denote that it is the "Season Three Mid-Season finale".

Episodes
The first season of The Black Tapes premiered May 21, 2015. The last episode, the mid-season finale, was released November 7, 2017.

Season 1

Season 2

Season 3
This season was re-released on 13 January 2020 with changes to the description of episode 6 "Into the Black" to describe it as the "mid-season finale".

Music

'The Kingdom of the Universe', which is played near the start of each episode, was written by Ashley Park. Terry Miles wrote the podcast's theme. The series uses free royalty-free music by Kevin MacLeod.

Reception
The podcast has received generally favorable reviews for its writing, production, and intricacy. Melissa Locker in The Guardian described the podcast as taking place in "a world where math, musical theory, obscure points of history, and science become either clues of a possible demonic invasion – or just random events linked only by an active imagination."

See also
 Tanis, a sister show to The Black Tapes in which Alex Reagan sometimes appeared
Horror podcast

References

External links

2015 podcast debuts
Audio podcasts
Horror podcasts
2017 podcast endings
Scripted podcasts